Mount Pollock is a symmetrical mountain (2,640 m) that rises above the mid-portion of Recoil Glacier just south of Archambault Ridge, in the Deep Freeze Range, Victoria Land of Antarctica. Mapped by United States Geological Survey (USGS) from surveys and US. Navy air photos, 1960–64. Named by Advisory Committee on Antarctic Names (US-ACAN) for Herbert W. Pollock, U.S. Navy, construction electrician at McMurdo Station, 1962 and 1967.

Mountains of Victoria Land
Scott Coast